This is a list of residences once occupied by Hawaiian royalty during the Kingdom of Hawaii. Few can be referred to as palaces; most were private residences used by the aliʻi nui.

Royal residences

Gallery

References

Bibliography

Further reading

External links 

Video: Homes of Hawaiian Royalty by Co Creative Studios

 
Royal residences
Hawaii
Hawaiian royal residences
Hawaiian